Eleanor of Aragon (1346–1405) was a countess of Caltabellotta (Sicilian: Cataviddotta), a comune (municipality) in the Province of Agrigento in the Italian region Sicily, located about  south of Palermo and about  northwest of Agrigento.

Life
She was the daughter of infante John, fourth son of Frederick III of Aragon and Eleanor of Anjou. Eleanor of Aragon's mother Cesarea Lancia was eldest daughter of Peter, Count of Caltanissetta.

She died in Giuliana, Sicily and the bust from her funerary monument is now in the Galleria regionale di Palazzo Abatellis in Palermo.

Sources

1346 births
1405 deaths
House of Aragon